Melvin Lee Greenwood (born October 27, 1942) is an American country music singer-songwriter. He also plays the saxophone.  Active since 1962, he has released more than 20 major-label albums and has charted more than 35 singles on the Billboard country music charts.

Greenwood is known for his patriotic signature song "God Bless the U.S.A.", which was originally released and successful in 1984, and became popular again during the Gulf War in 1991 and after the September 11, 2001, attacks (becoming his highest charting pop hit, reaching number 16 on the Billboard Hot 100), and again during the 2016 and 2020 United States presidential elections as President Donald Trump's rally introduction track. He also has charted seven number-ones on the US Hot Country Songs list in his career: "Somebody's Gonna Love You", "Going, Going, Gone", "Dixie Road", "I Don't Mind the Thorns (If You're the Rose)", "Don't Underestimate My Love For You", "Hearts Aren't Made to Break (They're Made to Love)", and "Mornin' Ride". His 1983 single "I.O.U." was also a top-five hit on the adult contemporary charts, and a number 53 on the Hot 100.

Early life
Greenwood was born in South Gate, California, a few miles south of Los Angeles. After the separation of his parents, he grew up in Louisiana, Sacramento on the poultry farm of his maternal grandparents. At the age of seven, he started singing in church. In 1969, he joined the Chester Smith Band and had his first television appearance. A short time later, he worked with the country musician Del Reeves.

He founded his first band, The Apollos, in 1962. The band, which changed its name later to Lee Greenwood Affair, played mostly pop music and appeared mostly in casinos in Las Vegas, Nevada. A few records were recorded in Los Angeles with the Paramount label. After the band broke up in the 1970s, Greenwood moved back to Las Vegas where he worked as a blackjack dealer during the day, and as a singer at night. He is well known for his meet and greets at Hy-Vee grocery stores.

Career

In 1979, he was discovered in Reno, Nevada, by Larry McFaden, the bandleader and bassist of Mel Tillis. After making some demo tapes, Greenwood was signed in 1981 by the Nashville division of the MCA label (which had recently absorbed the Paramount label), and McFaden became his manager.

The first single, the Jan Crutchfield-penned "It Turns Me Inside Out", made it to a spot in the top 20 of the country chart in 1981. The song had been written for Kenny Rogers, but Rogers turned it down due to the sheer volume of songs he had been offered at the time. "Ring on Her Finger, Time on Her Hands" landed him in the country top 10. Each song was marketed heavily, particularly in the South Florida market by MCA Account Service Representative, Brad Fitzgerald, among others.

Greenwood is known for writing and recording "God Bless the U.S.A." in the early 1980s, and later "God Bless You Canada". The song gained renewed popularity following the launch of Operation: Desert Storm in 1991, and again, 10 years later, following the September 11, 2001, attacks. "God Bless the U.S.A." re-entered the top 20 of the country charts in late 2001. Since then, Greenwood has played across the US, at many public events and commemorations of the attacks.

The day before the inauguration of Donald Trump, Greenwood performed at the Make America Great! Welcome Celebration. "God Bless the U.S.A." was used by Donald Trump as one of his campaign songs during the 2016 presidential election and the 2018 midterm elections, and was used again during the 2020 presidential election.

Greenwood performed for Marsha Blackburn after her victory in her Senate election.

On May 19, 2018, Lee Greenwood was awarded the MMP Music Award for his lifelong contribution to the music industry and inducted into the MMP Hall of Fame by Commander Joseph W. Clark.

National Council on the Arts
In September 2008, President George W. Bush nominated Greenwood to succeed Makoto Fujimura for a six-year term to the National Council on the Arts expiring in 2014. He was confirmed by the Senate via voice vote in October 2008. In 2015, President Barack Obama nominated Esperanza Spalding to succeed Greenwood; however, the nomination was not acted upon by the Senate, allowing Greenwood to continuing serving under Presidents Barack Obama and Donald Trump until the Senate confirmed a nominated successor. In June 2021, President Joe Biden nominated Kamilah Forbes to succeed Greenwood. In September 2021, Greenwood told Fox and Friends that the Biden administration sent him an email informing him that the president had already nominated his replacement on the National Council on the Arts and expressed his "shock" at being replaced. Forbes got confirmed by the Senate on February 17, 2022, via voice vote.

Theater
In 1995, Greenwood took a break from his touring schedule to spend more time with his family. In his time off, he elected to build a theater in Sevierville, Tennessee, and in April 1996, the Lee Greenwood Theater opened its doors. This gave Greenwood the opportunity to perform daily shows, in addition to being with his family. The theater operated for five seasons, and closed for Greenwood to continue touring. The former theater building is host to a church.

Family
Greenwood is married to former Miss Tennessee USA Kimberly Payne, his fourth marriage. They have two sons together, Dalton and Parker Greenwood.

Discography

References

Bibliography
 Wood, Gerry (1998). "Lee Greenwood". In The Encyclopedia of Country Music. Paul Kingsbury, Editor. New York: Oxford University Press. pp. 212–3.

External links

 
 

1942 births
20th-century American singers
20th-century American male singers
20th-century American saxophonists
21st-century American singers
21st-century American male singers
21st-century American saxophonists
American country singer-songwriters
American male saxophonists
American male singer-songwriters
California Republicans
Conservatism in the United States
Right-wing politics in the United States
Country musicians from California
Grammy Award winners
Living people
People from South Gate, California
Singer-songwriters from California
Singers from Los Angeles
Tennessee Republicans